Beck (also known as Beck.com B-Sides) is an EP by the American musician Beck, consisting of B-sides from the Midnite Vultures era. The EP was only available on Beck's website, and only 10,000 copies were printed. The EP was an enhanced CD and it also included the "Nicotine & Gravy" video.

Track listing
 "Arabian Nights" - 4:11
 "Dirty Dirty" - 4:38
 "Midnite Vultures" - 7:17
 "Mixed Bizness" (The Latin Mix by Scatter-Shot Theory) - 4:57
 "Mixed Bizness" (Hardmixn by Jake Kozel, aka Socket 7) - 6:16
 "Salt in the Wound" - 3:24
 "Sexx Laws" (Malibu remix) - 6:52
 "Zatyricon" - 5:13
 "Nicotine & Gravy" (enhanced video) - 3:22

References
 diskobox Beck.com B-sides
 Fader: Beck Does Online B-Sides Album

External links
musicbrainz Beck.com B-Sides
Beck's official website

Beck albums
2001 EPs
2001 compilation albums
B-side compilation albums
Geffen Records EPs